Sally Nelson Robins (March 18, 1855 – ) was an American librarian, newspaper columnist, and suffragist.

Biography 
Sally Nelson Robins was born on March 18, 1855, in Gloucester County, Virginia. She studied at the Eclectic Institute, Baltimore, Maryland.

She was descended from Thomas Nelson. She married William Todd Robins in 1878; they had six children, including a son, Augustine Warner Robins. They moved to Richmond. She was assistant librarian for the Virginia Historical Society. She was genealogical editor for the Richmond Times-Dispatch. She was a member of the Equal Suffrage League of Virginia.

Sally Nelson Robins died on 4 February 1925 in Richmond. She was buried at Ware Episcopal Church Cemetery. 

Her correspondence is held at the New York Public Library.

Works 
 History of Gloucester County, Virginia, and its Families. 1893.

References

External links 
 https://documents.alexanderstreet.com/d/1009860108 

Created via preloaddraft
1855 births
1925 deaths
American suffragists
Activists from Virginia
American librarians
American women librarians
American women non-fiction writers
19th-century American non-fiction writers
19th-century American women writers
20th-century American non-fiction writers
20th-century American women writers
Writers from Virginia
People from Gloucester County, Virginia